Advocaat  or advocatenborrel is a traditional Dutch alcoholic beverage made from eggs, sugar, and brandy. The rich and creamy drink has a smooth, custard-like consistency. The typical alcohol content is generally between 14% and 20% ABV. Its contents may be a blend of egg yolks, aromatic spirits, sugar or honey, brandy, vanilla, and sometimes cream (or condensed milk). Notable makers of advocaat include Warninks, Bols, Darna Ovo Liker, DeKuyper (in two varieties), and Verpoorten.

Etymology
Two theories have been put out on the origins of "advocaat".

According to several makers, such as Verpoorten and Bols, and the Oxford companion to Sugar and Sweets, its origins can be traced back to "abacate", an alcoholic beverage of the indigenous people in Brazil, which was made with avocado. Dutch colonials of northern Brazil introduced this beverage to Europe as "advocat/advocaat". As avocados could not grow in northern Europe, they were replaced with egg yolk, thought to have a similar taste and consistency, and the name derived from the avocado stuck, although the drink no longer contains any.

Advocaat  is also the Dutch word for lawyer in the sense of solicitor. As the name of the drink, it is short for advocatenborrel, or 'lawyers' drink'. borrel is Dutch for a small alcoholic beverage (liqueur, brandy, etc. but not beer or wine) consumed slowly during a social gathering or an informal occasion where work colleagues meet for light conversation with beer and wine. According to the 1882 edition of the Woordenboek der Nederlandsche taal (Dictionary of the Dutch Language), it is "zoo genoemd als een goed smeersel voor de keel, en dus bijzonder dienstig geacht voor een advocaat, die in 't openbaar het woord moet voeren" ("so named as a good lubricant for the throat, and thus considered especially useful for a lawyer, who must speak in public").

Types and uses

Jars and wide mouth bottles of thick advocaat are sold mainly in the Netherlands and Belgium, though may be available in Germany and Austria. Further exports are of a more liquid version.

In particular the original thick variety, i.e.  without albumen, is used as a waffle, pancake or poffertjes topping, as an ingredient for ice cream, custards, pastries and similar desserts, or as an apéritif or digestif. The latter, possibly topped with whipped cream and then occasionally sprinkled with a touch of cocoa powder, is served in a very tiny bowl or small glass from which it is eaten by use of a teaspoon. In Belgian restaurants and taverns, it may be a complementary accompaniment to a coffee.

In the export variety both parts of the eggs are used. The best known cocktail using advocaat is the Snowball: a mixture of advocaat, sparkling lemonade and sometimes (although this is not required) lime juice that is often consumed at Christmas time. Another is the Fluffy duck, made with rum. Another advocaat-based beverage is the Bombardino, a drink commonly found in Italian ski resorts, particularly the Italian Alps, made by mixing advocaat, brandy, and whipped cream.

Related drinks
The Polish equivalent,  ( 'eggs' and ), is based on vodka instead of brandy, despite what the name may suggest.

Some varieties have additional flavourings.

See also

References

Further reading

External links 
 

Dutch liqueurs
Eggs (food)
Liqueurs
17th-century introductions